The Osirica is purported Black Egyptian masonic order. It is mentioned in some afrocentric discussions of ancient Egyptian history. The theory of its existence is based on archeological evidence of an Egyptian village near Deir el-Medina. There it has been discovered that the inhabitants were developing their education in a very progressive manner. From there they became the principal architects and builders of the tombs of the Valley of the Kings. The word "Osirica" may likely have been the Hellenization of the ancient Egyptian word "Asauru" which translates "followers of Osiris". The word is used in many French and Italian references to ancient Egyptian culture and history, but very rarely is found in English.

The word was first used in English by George Granville Monah James book Stolen Legacy in 1954. George G.M. James is a controversial Afrocentricist whose work and motives have been hotly criticised by the mainstream Egyptology.

Lately, the Osirica are championed by Afrocentric scholars and students as the original ancient "Lodge" of the Masonic order (Freemasonry), and the foundation of most modern Masonry orders.

This claim that the classical period Greek masonic orders gained their knowledge from Egyptian sources may be based on legends originating from an ancient Egyptian village at present day Deir el-Medina, Egypt.  This village was originally named "Ta Set Ma'at" (the Place of Truth), and was founded in the New Kingdom in the early 16th century B.C., by the 17th Dynasty Pharaoh Amenhotep I. There the craftsmen and women were the builders of the tombs of the Valley of the Kings. There they used masonry and craftsmanship that they taught in a vocational manner, much like current day technical schools.

The word Osirica could also be a mistranslation of the word "ostraca" which were pottery fragments found at the Deir el-Medina site.

Ancient Egyptian society
African secret societies
Freemasonry